This is a list of the French singles & airplay chart reviews number-ones of 1960.

Number-ones by week

Singles chart

See also
1960 in music
List of number-one hits (France)

References

1960 in France
1960 record charts
Lists of number-one songs in France